The Rotherham child sexual exploitation scandal consisted of the organised child sexual abuse that occurred in the town of Rotherham, South Yorkshire, Northern England from the late 1980s until the 2010s and the failure of local authorities to act on reports of the abuse throughout most of that period. Researcher Angie Heal, who was hired by local officials and warned them about child exploitation occurring between 2002 and 2007, has since described it as the "biggest child protection scandal in UK history". Evidence of the abuse was first noted in the early 1990s, when care home managers investigated reports that children in their care were being picked up by taxi drivers. From at least 2001, multiple reports passed names of alleged perpetrators, several from one family, to the police and Rotherham Council. The first group conviction took place in 2010, when five British-Pakistani men were convicted of sexual offences against girls aged 12–16. From January 2011 Andrew Norfolk of The Times pressed the issue, reporting in 2012 that the abuse in the town was widespread and that the police and council had known about it for over ten years.

The Times articles, along with the 2012 trial of the Rochdale child sex abuse ring, prompted the House of Commons Home Affairs Committee to conduct hearings. Following this and further articles from Norfolk, Rotherham Council commissioned an independent inquiry led by Professor Alexis Jay. In August 2014 the Jay report concluded that an estimated 1,400 children had been sexually abused in Rotherham between 1997 and 2013, predominantly by British-Pakistani men. British Asian girls in Rotherham also suffered abuse, but a fear of shame and dishonour made them reluctant to report the abuse to authorities. A "common thread" was that taxi drivers had been picking the children up for sex from care homes and schools. The abuse included gang rape, forcing children to watch rape, dousing them with petrol and threatening to set them on fire, threatening to rape their mothers and younger sisters, as well as trafficking them to other towns. There were pregnancies (one at age 12), pregnancy terminations, miscarriages, babies raised by their mothers, in addition to babies removed, causing further trauma.

The failure to address the abuse was attributed to a combination of factors revolving around race, class, religion and gender—contemptuous and sexist attitudes toward the mostly working-class victims; lack of a child-centred focus; a desire to protect the town's reputation; and lack of training and resources. 

Rotherham Council's chief executive, its director of children's services, as well as the Police and Crime Commissioner for South Yorkshire Police all resigned. The Independent Police Complaints Commission and the National Crime Agency both opened inquiries, the latter expected to last eight years. The government appointed Louise Casey to conduct an inspection of Rotherham Council. Published in January 2015, the Casey report concluded that the council had a bullying, sexist culture of covering up information and silencing whistleblowers; it was "not fit for purpose". In February 2015 the government replaced the council's elected officers with a team of five commissioners. As a result of new police inquiries, 19 men and two women were convicted in 2016 and 2017 of sexual offences in the town dating back to the late 1980s; one of the ringleaders was jailed for 35 years.

Background

Rotherham

With a population of 109,691, according to the 2011 census—55,751 female and 24,783 aged 0–17—Rotherham is the largest town within the South Yorkshire Metropolitan Borough of Rotherham. Around 11.9 per cent of the town belonged to black and minority ethnic groups, compared to eight per cent of the borough (population 258,400). Three percent of the borough belonged to the Pakistani-heritage community. There were 68,574 Christians in the town in 2011, 23,909 with no religion, 8,682 Muslims, 7,527 not stated, and a small number of Hindus, Sikhs, Jews and Buddhists. Unemployment in the borough was above the national average, and 23 per cent of homes consisted of social housing.

The area has traditionally been a Labour stronghold, and until Sarah Champion was elected in 2012 it had never had a female MP. The council was similarly male-dominated; one Labour insider told The Guardian in 2012: "The Rotherham political class is male, male, male." In May 2014 there were 63 elected members on Rotherham Metropolitan Borough Council: 57 Labour, four Conservatives, one UKIP and one Independent. The elections in August that year saw a swing to UKIP: 49 Labour, 10 UKIP, 2 Conservatives and 2 Independents. The government disbanded the council in 2015 after the Casey report and replaced it with a team of five commissioners.

Terminology
The term child sexual exploitation (CSE) was first used in 2009 in a Department for Education document. Intended to replace the term child prostitution, which implied a level of consent, CSE is a form of child sexual abuse in which children are offered something—money, drugs, alcohol, food, a place to stay, or even just affection—in exchange for sexual activity. Violence and intimidation are common. Adele Gladman and Angie Heal, authors of early reports on the Rotherham abuse, argue that describing vaginal, oral and anal rape, murder and attempted murder as "exploitation" does not help people understand the seriousness of the crimes.

CSE includes online grooming and localised grooming, formerly known as on-street grooming. Localised grooming involves a group of abusers targeting vulnerable children in a public place, offering them sweets, alcohol, drugs and takeaway food in exchange for sex. The targets can include children in the care of the local authority; in Rotherham, one third of the targeted children were previously known to social services.

According to the House of Commons Home Affairs Committee in 2013, the first contact might be made by other children, who hand the target over to an older man. One of the adult perpetrators becomes the "boyfriend", but the girl is used for sex by the larger group and comes to view this as the norm. The abuse can involve being gang raped by dozens of men during one event. Victims are often trafficked to other towns, where sexual access to the child might be "sold" to other groups. According to one victim, the perpetrators prefer children aged 12–14. As they get older, the group loses interest and may expect the child to supply younger children in exchange for continued access to the group, on which the child has come to rely for drugs, alcohol, a social life, "affection" or even a home.

Risky Business

The earliest reports of localised grooming in Rotherham date to the early 1990s, when several managers of local children's homes set up the "taxi driver group" to investigate reports that taxis driven by Pakistani men were arriving at care homes to take the children away. The police apparently declined to act.

In 1997 Rotherham Council created a local youth project, Risky Business, to work with girls and women aged 11–25 thought to be at risk of sexual exploitation on the streets. Jayne Senior, awarded an MBE in the 2016 Birthday Honours for her role in uncovering the abuse, began working for Risky Business as a coordinator around July 1999. The users were overwhelmingly white girls: of the 268 who used the project from March 2001 to March 2002, 244 were white, 22 were British-Asian, and 2 were black.

Senior began to find evidence around 2001 of what appeared to be a localised-grooming network. Most Risky Business clients had previously come from Sheffield, which had a red-light district. Now the girls were younger and came from Rotherham. Girls as young as 10 were being befriended, perhaps by children their own age, before being passed to older men who would rape them and become their "boyfriends". Many of the girls were from troubled families, but not all. The children were given alcohol and drugs, then told they had to repay the "debt" by having sex with other men. The perpetrators set about obtaining personal information about the girls and their families—where their parents worked, for example—details that were used to threaten the girls if they tried to withdraw. Windows at family homes were smashed; threats were made to rape mothers and younger sisters. The children came to believe that the only way to keep their families safe was to cooperate.

One girl who came to the attention of Risky Business was repeatedly raped from age 13–15, and believed her mother would be the next victim: "They used to follow my mum because they used to know when she went shopping, what time she had been shopping, where she had gone." A 15-year-old was told she was "one bullet" away from death. Girls were doused in petrol and told they were about to die. When she told her "pimp" that she was pregnant and did not know who the father was, one 15-year-old was beaten unconscious with a clawhammer. A 12-year-old with a 24-year-old "boyfriend" had a mother who invited the perpetrators into the family home, where the girl would give the men oral sex for 10 cigarettes.

According to Senior, Risky Business ended up with so much information about the perpetrators that the police suggested she start forwarding it to an electronic dropbox, "Box Five", on the South Yorkshire Police computer network. They reportedly told her this would protect the identity of Risky Business's sources. She learned later that the police had not read the reports she had left there, and it apparently could not be accessed by other forces.

Risky Business was seen as a "nuisance" and shut down by the council in 2011.

Issues of ethnicity 
The Jay inquiry estimated that there may be 1,400 victims of diverse ethnic backgrounds.

The report stated that "there is no simple link between race and child sexual exploitation", and cited a 2013 report by Muslim Women's Network UK of British Asian girls being abused across the country in situations that mirrored the abuse in Rotherham. According to the group, Asian victims may be particularly vulnerable to threats of bringing shame and dishonour on their families, and may have believed that reporting the abuse would be an admission that they had violated their Islamic beliefs. The Jay report also noted that one of the local Pakistani women's groups had described Pakistani girls being targeted by Pakistani taxi drivers and landlords, but they feared reporting to the police out of concerns for their marriage prospects. The report stated that "the under-reporting of exploitation and abuse in minority ethnic communities" should be addressed.

The Jay report "found no evidence of children's social care staff being influenced by concerns about the ethnic origins of suspected perpetrators when dealing with individual child protection cases, including CSE".

Weir report (2001)

Home Office pilot study
In 2000 Adele Weir (later Gladman), a Yorkshire solicitor, was hired by Rotherham Council as a research and development officer on a Home Office Crime Reduction Programme pilot study, "Tackling Prostitution: What Works". A section of the study was devoted to "young people and prostitution", and three towns—Bristol, Sheffield and Rotherham—were to be highlighted in that section. Weir was employed to write the report on Rotherham. Part of her project's aim was: "Collection of information and evidence about men allegedly involved in coercing young women into prostitution with which it might be possible for the police to pursue investigations and/or prosecutions."

Researchers at the University of Bedfordshire, including the social scientist Margaret Melrose, were involved as Home Office evaluators. Weir's line manager was the manager of Risky Business, and she was placed in the Risky Business offices in Rotherham's International Centre, where she worked with Jayne Senior. According to Weir, she encountered "poor professional practice from an early stage" from the council and police; child protection issues were, in her view, "disregarded, dismissed or minimized".

Mapping exercise
In response to a complaint from police that evidence of child abuse in Rotherham was anecdotal, Weir compiled a 10-page mapping exercise in 2001 showing what appeared to be a local abuse network. In evidence to the Home Affairs Committee in 2014, she wrote that she had found "a small number of suspected abusers who were well known to all significant services in Rotherham." Using material obtained by Risky Business, and from health services, social services, police records, a homelessness project, and substance-misuse services, Weir's report included names of suspects, the registration numbers of cars used to transport the girls, the suspects' links to local businesses and to people outside the area, and the relationships between the suspects and the girls. The suspects included members of the Hussain family, thought to be among the network's ringleaders, who were jailed in 2016.  Weir estimated at that point that there were 270 victims.

Home Office report
Weir's report for the Home Office evaluators linked 54 abused children to the Hussain family, as of October 2001. Eighteen children had named one of those men, Arshid Hussain (then around 25), as their "boyfriend", and several had become pregnant. One of the 18 girls—14 years old at the time—got pregnant twice. In 2014 she told Panorama that social workers had expressed concern about Hussain being around a baby because of his history of violence, but had not, according to the victim, expressed the same concern for her; she told Panorama that they maintained her relationship with him was consensual. (In February 2016 Arshid Hussain was convicted of multiple rapes and jailed for 35 years.)

The Weir report continued that members of the family were "alleged to be responsible for much of the violent crime and drug dealing in the town". They used untraceable mobile phones, the report said, had access to expensive cars, were linked to a taxi firm, and may have been involved in bed-and-breakfast hotels that were used by social services for emergency accommodation. Several girls sent to those hotels had complained of being offered money, as soon as they arrived, if they would have sex with several men. Other girls were targeted at train and bus stations.

Weir handed her report to a South Yorkshire Police inspector; the only feedback was that it was "unhelpful". According to the Jay report, one incident was, for Weir, the "final straw". A victim decided to file a complaint with the police. The perpetrators had smashed her parents' windows and broken her brothers' legs to stop her from reporting the rapes. Weir took her to the police station, but while there the victim received a text from the perpetrator to say he had her 11-year-old sister with him, and it was "your choice". This led the victim to believe someone had told the perpetrator she was at the police station, and she decided not to proceed with the complaint. Following this, with the consent of her manager, Weir wrote in October 2001 to Mike Hedges, the Chief Constable of South Yorkshire Police, and to Christine Burbeary, the District Commander. The letter said:

The letter was not well received by the council or police. During a meeting at Rotherham police station with senior police and council officials, they seemed incensed that Weir had written to the Chief Constable. Jayne Senior, who was present, said Weir was subjected to a "tirade that lasted I don't know how long". According to Weir, at some point after this an official warned her against mentioning Asian men:

Files removed

At their request, Weir sent her data to the Home Office evaluators in Bedfordshire in April 2002. That Weir did this apparently upset the Risky Business manager. On or around Monday, 18 April 2002, when she arrived at work, Weir discovered that over the weekend her Home Office pilot data had been removed from the filing cabinets in the Risky Business office.

Weir said that the password-protected office computer had also been accessed. According to Weir's evidence to the Home Affairs Committee, documents had been deleted, and someone had created, on the computer, the minutes of meetings that Weir had purportedly attended, which showed her agreeing to certain conditions, such as not submitting data to Home Office evaluators without her line manager's consent. Weir told the committee that she had not agreed to those conditions or attended any such meeting; one of the meetings had taken place while she was on holiday overseas.

Weir was told that social services, the police and education staff had met over the weekend, and had decided that Risky Business staff were "exceeding [their] roles". Weir was suspended for having included in her report data from confidential minutes, an "act of gross misconduct"; she managed to negotiate a return to work by demonstrating that it was her manager who had passed those minutes to the Home Office evaluators. She was told she would no longer have access to Risky Business data, meetings, or the girls, and in June 2002 she was asked to amend her report to "anonymise individuals and institutions and only include facts and evidence that you are able to substantiate". The Jay report found the secrecy surrounding the report and the treatment of Weir "deeply troubling": "If the senior people concerned had paid more attention to the content of the report, more might have been done to help children who were being violently exploited and abused."

Heal reports

2002 report

In 2002–2007 South Yorkshire Police hired Angie Heal, a strategic drugs analyst, to carry out research on drug use and supply in the area. Located in the drug strategy unit with two police officers, Heal wrote several reports during this period. During her research in 2002 into the local supply of crack cocaine, she first encountered examples of organised child sexual abuse, and consulted Jayne Senior of Risky Business and Anne Lucas, the child exploitation service officer in Sheffield. Lucas explained that part of the grooming process was to give the children drugs.

Heal's first report in 2002 recommended dealing with the child-abuse rings; if the evidence needed to prosecute the men for sex offences was lacking, they could be prosecuted for drugs offences instead, thereby keeping the children safe and getting the drugs off the street. Heal wrote in 2017 that her report was widely read, but she "could not believe the complete lack of interest" in the links she had provided between the local drug trade and child abuse.

2003 report
Heal decided to continue researching the issue and included CSE in her bi-annual intelligence briefings. While Heal was preparing her second report, Sexual Exploitation, Drug Use and Drug Dealing: Current Situation in South Yorkshire (2003), Jayne Senior secretly shared with her Adele Weir's Home Office report from 2002. Heal wrote that she actually felt scared after she had read it, given the level of detail, the lack of interest, and the sidelining of Weir.

Heal's 2003 report noted that Rotherham had a "significant number of girls and some boys who are being sexually exploited"; that the victims were being gang raped, kidnapped and subjected to other violence; that a significant number had become pregnant, and were depressed, angry and self-harming; and that Risky Business had identified four of the perpetrators as brothers. Heal created two versions of her report. One was for wider distribution among officials. The second, for the police alone, contained the names of the perpetrators, obtained from Risky Business.

2006 report
In 2005 a new department of children and young people's services was created, with Councillor Shaun Wright appointed cabinet member for the department, and in March 2006 a conference was held in Rotherham, "Every Child Matters, But Do They Know it?", to discuss children's sexual exploitation. Heal's third report, Violence and Gun Crime: Links with Sexual Exploitation, Prostitution and Drug Markets in South Yorkshire (2006), noted that the situation was continuing and involved "systematic physical and sexual violence against young women". The victims were being trafficked to other towns, and the violence used was "very severe". If the girls protested, the perpetrators threatened to involve the girls' younger sisters, friends and family. There had also been an increase in reports of the perpetrators being seen with guns.

Heal wrote that white girls were the main victims, targeted from age 11; the average age was 12–13. British-Asian girls were also targeted, but their abuse was hidden, not part of the localised-grooming scene. The most significant group of perpetrators of localised grooming were British-Asian men. Several employees dealing with the issue believed that the perpetrators' ethnicity was preventing the abuse from being addressed, Heal wrote. One worker said that British-Asian taxi drivers in Rotherham had been involved for 30 years, but in the 1970s the crimes had not been organised. Heal added that a high-profile publicity campaign was underway about the trafficking of women from Eastern Europe, with posters in Doncaster Sheffield Airport, while the issue of local trafficking "appears to be largely ignored". The report recommended: "More emphasis should be placed on tackling the abusers, rather than the abused."

Heal sent her 2006 report to everyone involved in the Rotherham Drugs Partnership, and to the South Yorkshire Police district commander and chief superintendents. Shortly after this, according to the Jay report, Risky Business's funding was increased, and the council's Safeguarding Children Board approved an "Action Plan for responding to the sexual exploitation of children and young people in Rotherham".

It became clear to Heal around this time that she was being sidelined. The drug strategy unit was disbanded, and she was told that several officers in her department were not supportive of her or her work. Given that she was reporting the rape of children, she writes that the lack of support "will never fail to astonish and sadden" her. She decided to leave the South Yorkshire Police in March 2007. Her 2003 and 2006 reports were released by South Yorkshire Police in May 2015 following a Freedom of Information Act request.

Operation Central, trial (2010)
In 2008 South Yorkshire Police set up Operation Central to investigate the allegations. As a result, eight men were tried at Sheffield Crown Court in October 2010 for sexual offences against girls aged 12–16. Four of the victims testified. Five men were convicted, including two brothers and a cousin. One of the brothers, Razwan Razaq, had a previous conviction for indecently assaulting a young girl in his car, and had breached a previous sexual offences prevention order. His brother Umar appealed against his sentence and was released after nine months. All five were placed on the sex offenders' register.

The Times investigation

Background
Andrew Norfolk of The Times first wrote about localised grooming in 2003, after moving from London to Leeds, when he wrote a brief story about the Keighley child sex abuse ring. Ann Cryer, MP for Keighley, had complained that "Asian men" were targeting teenage girls outside schools, while parents alleged that police and social services were declining to act. From then until 2010, Norfolk heard of court cases in northern England and the Midlands reporting a similar pattern.

Court records showed 17 cases of localised grooming in 13 northern towns since 1997—14 since 2008—in which 56 men were convicted of sexual offences against girls aged 11–16. Norfolk interviewed two of the affected families, and in January 2011 the first of a series of stories appeared over four pages in The Times, accompanied by an editorial, "Revealed: conspiracy of silence on UK sex gangs". Norfolk told the Home Affairs Committee in 2013 that council staff and senior police officers called him to thank him; one director of children's services told him: "My staff are jumping for joy in the office today because finally somebody has said what we have not felt able to say."

Murder of Laura Wilson
In 2012 Rotherham Council applied to the High Court for an injunction to stop Norfolk publishing an unredacted version of a serious case review written after the murder of a local girl, Laura Wilson.

Known in the review as "Child S", Wilson was 17 in October 2010 when she was stabbed 40 times and thrown in the canal by her 17-year-old ex-boyfriend, Ashtiaq Asghar, an act the police called an "honour killing". She had had a baby four months earlier by a 21-year-old married man. The families of the men, both Pakistani heritage, had apparently been unaware of the relationships and the existence of the child. Tired of being a secret, Wilson decided to tell them. Days later, the ex-boyfriend murdered her. Both men stood trial; the older man was acquitted, and Asghar was jailed for 17 years and six months.

Assessed as having an IQ of 56 and a reading and spelling age of 6, Wilson had been the target of localised grooming from at least age 11. The council had referred her to Risky Business three months after her 11th birthday, and when she was 13, Wilson and her family had appeared on The Jeremy Kyle Show to discuss children who were out of control. She had also been mentioned in the 2009 criminal inquiry that led to the first five convictions arising out of localised grooming in Rotherham.

The government ordered that the council publish its serious case review. It was published with passages blacked out on 61 of its 144 pages. Norfolk obtained an unredacted version, and found that the council had hidden the men's ethnicity, as well as Wilson's mention during the 2009 criminal inquiry, and the extent of the council's involvement in her care. Michael Gove, then education secretary, accused the council in June 2012 of withholding "relevant and important material". After Gove's intervention, the council withdrew its legal action, and Norfolk published the story under the headline "Officials hid vital facts about men suspected of grooming girl for sex".

September 2012

On 24 September 2012 Norfolk wrote that the abuse in Rotherham was much more widespread than acknowledged, and that the police had been aware of it for over a decade. His story, "Police files reveal vast child protection scandal", was based on 200 leaked documents, some from Jayne Senior, such as case files and letters from police and social services. The documents included Adele Weir's 2001 report for the Home Office, which linked 54 abused children to the Hussain family; 18 of the children had called Arshid Hussain their "boyfriend".

Cases highlighted by Norfolk included that of a 15-year-old having a broken bottle inserted into her; a 14-year-old being held in a flat and forced to have sex with five men; and a 13-year-old girl, "with disrupted clothing", found by police in a house at 3 am with a group of men who had given her vodka. A neighbour had called the police after hearing the girl scream. The girl was arrested for being drunk and disorderly, but the men were not questioned.

The newspaper cited a 2010 report by the police intelligence bureau that said, locally and nationally, and particularly in Sheffield and Rotherham, "there appears to be a significant problem with networks of Asian males exploiting young white females". South Yorkshire children were being trafficked to Birmingham, Bradford, Bristol, Dover, Manchester, and elsewhere, according to the police report. A document from Rotherham's Safeguarding Children Board reporting that the "crimes had 'cultural characteristics ... which are locally sensitive in terms of diversity'":

In August 2013 Norfolk published the story of a 15-year-old Rotherham girl, later revealed to be Sammy Woodhouse, who had been described in Adele Weir's report in 2001, and who was allowed by social services to maintain contact with Arshid Hussain, despite having been placed in care by her parents to protect her from him. (Hussain was jailed in 2016 for 35 years.) The girl had been made pregnant twice. One of those "aware of the relationship", according to the Times, was Jahangir Akhtar, then Rotherham Council's deputy leader, reportedly a relative of Hussain's. He resigned but denied the claims. Akhtar was one of the officials later described in the Casey report as wielding considerable influence on the council and reportedly known for shutting down discussion about the sexual abuse. Shortly after publication of the Times story, Rotherham Council commissioned the Jay inquiry.

Home Affairs Committee

Hearings
The House of Commons Home Affairs Committee began hearing evidence about localised grooming in June 2012, as a result of the Rotherham convictions in 2010 (Operation Central), Andrew Norfolk's articles in the Times, and the Rochdale child sex abuse ring (Operation Span), which saw 12 men convicted in May 2012. The committee published its report, Child sexual exploitation and the response to localised grooming, in June 2013, with a follow-up in October 2014 in response to the Jay report.

In October 2012 the committee criticised South Yorkshire's chief constable, David Crompton, and one of its senior officers, Philip Etheridge. The committee heard evidence that three members of a family connected with the abuse of 61 girls had not been charged, and no action was taken when a 22-year-old man was found in a car with a 12-year-old girl, with indecent images of her on his phone. Crompton said that "ethnic origin" was not a factor in deciding whether to charge suspects. The committee said that they were very concerned, as was the public.

During a hearing in September 2014 to discuss Rotherham, the committee chair, Keith Vaz, told Crompton that the committee was shocked by the evidence, and that it held South Yorkshire Police responsible. Asked about an incident in which a 13-year-old found in a flat with a group of men was arrested for being drunk and disorderly, Crompton said it would be referred to the Independent Police Complaints Commission.

In January 2013 the committee summoned the head of Rotherham Council, Martin Kimber, to explain the lack of arrests, despite South Yorkshire Police saying it was conducting investigations and the council having identified 58 young girls at risk. Vaz questioned why, after five Asian men were jailed in 2010, more was not done: "In Lancashire there were 100 prosecutions the year before last, in South Yorkshire there were no prosecutions." The council apologised for the "systemic failure" that had "let down" the victims.

October 2014 report
The committee's follow-up report on 18 October 2014 detailed the disappearance of Adele Weir's files containing data on the abuse from the Risky Business office in 2002. The allegations were made in private hearings. Keith Vaz said: "The proliferation of revelations about files which can no longer be located gives rise to public suspicion of a deliberate cover-up. The only way to address these concerns is with a full, transparent and urgent investigation." The report called for new legislation to allow the removal of elected Police and Crime Commissioners following a vote of no confidence.

Jay inquiry

Report

In October 2013 Rotherham Council commissioned Professor Alexis Jay, a former chief social work adviser to the Scottish government, to conduct an independent inquiry into its handling of child-sexual-exploitation reports since 1997. Published on 26 August 2014, the Jay report revealed that an estimated 1,400 children, by a "conservative estimate", had been sexually exploited in Rotherham between 1997 and 2013. According to the report, children as young as 11 were "raped by multiple perpetrators, abducted, trafficked to other cities in England, beaten and intimidated".

Taxi drivers were a "common thread", picking up children for sex from schools and care homes. The inquiry team found examples where "a child was doused in petrol and threatened with being set alight, children who were threatened with guns, children who witnessed brutally violent rapes and were threatened that they would be the next victim if they told anyone. Girls as young as 11 were raped by large numbers of male perpetrators, one after the other." According to the report:

One child who was being prepared to give evidence received a text saying the perpetrator had her younger sister and the choice of what happened next was up to her. She withdrew her statements. At least two other families were terrorised by groups of perpetrators, sitting in cars outside the family home, smashing windows, making abusive and threatening phone calls. On some occasions child victims went back to perpetrators in the belief that this was the only way their parents and other children in the family would be safe. In the most extreme cases, no one in the family believed that the authorities could protect them.

The report noted that babies were born as a result of the abuse. There were also miscarriages and terminations. Several girls were able to look after their babies with help from social services, but in other cases babies were permanently removed, causing further trauma to the mother and mother's family. Sarah Champion, who in 2012 succeeded Denis MacShane as Labour MP for Rotherham, said this "spoke volumes about the way these children weren't seen as victims at all".

The police had shown a lack of respect for the victims in the early 2000s, according to the report, deeming them "undesirables" unworthy of police protection. The concerns of Jayne Senior, the former youth worker, were met with "indifference and scorn". Because most of the perpetrators were of Pakistani heritage, several council staff described themselves as being nervous about identifying the ethnic origins of perpetrators for fear of being thought racist; others, the report noted, "remembered clear direction from their managers" not to make such identification. The report noted the experience of Adele Weir, the Home Office researcher, who attempted to raise concerns about the abuse with senior police officers in 2002; she was told not to do so again, and was subsequently sidelined.

Staff described Rotherham Council as macho, sexist and bullying, according to the report. There were sexist comments to female employees, particularly during the period 1997–2009. One woman reported being told to wear shorter skirts to "get on better"; another was asked if she wore a mask while having sex. The Jay report noted that "[t]he existence of such a culture ... is likely to have impeded the Council from providing an effective, corporate response to such a highly sensitive social problem as child sexual exploitation." Several people who spoke to the Jay inquiry were concerned that Rotherham Council officials were connected to the perpetrators through business interests such as the taxi firm; the police assured the inquiry that there was no evidence of this.

Resignations
The Jay report prompted the resignations of Roger Stone, Labour leader of Rotherham Council, and Martin Kimber, its chief executive. Despite being strongly criticized during appearances before the House Affairs Committee, Joyce Thacker, the council's director of children's services, and Shaun Wright, the Police and Crime Commissioner (PCC) for South Yorkshire Police from 2012—and Labour councillor in charge of child safety at the council from 2005 to 2010—would not step down. They did eventually, in September, under pressure; Wright was asked to step down by Theresa May, then Home Secretary; members of his own party; and Rotherham's Labour MP Sarah Champion. He also resigned from the Labour Party, on 27 August 2014, after an ultimatum by the party to do so or face suspension.

Roger Stone was suspended from the Labour Party, as were councillors Gwendoline Russell and Shaukat Ali, and former deputy council leader Jahangir Akhtar, who had lost his council seat in 2014. Malcolm Newsam was appointed as Children's Social Care Commissioner in October 2014, and subsequently Ian Thomas was appointed as interim director of children's services.

Reception

There was worldwide astonishment at the Jay report's findings, and extensive news coverage. Ten of the UK's most popular newspapers featured the report on their front pages, including the Times, Guardian, Daily Telegraph and Independent.

David Crompton, Chief Constable of South Yorkshire Police from 2012 to 2016, invited the National Crime Agency to conduct an independent inquiry. Keith Vaz, then chair of the Home Affairs Committee, told Meredydd Hughes, Chief Constable from 2004 to 2011, that Hughes had failed abuse victims.

Theresa May, then Home Secretary, accused the authorities of a "dereliction of duty". She blamed several factors, including Rotherham Council's "institutionalised political correctness", inadequate scrutiny and culture of covering things up, combined with a fear of being seen as racist and a "disdainful attitude" toward the children. Denis MacShane, MP for Rotherham from 1994 until his resignation in 2012 for claiming false expenses, blamed a culture of "not wanting to rock the multicultural community boat". Simon Danczuk, Labour MP for Rochdale, where similar cases were prosecuted, argued that ethnicity, class and the night-time economy were all factors, adding that "a very small minority" in the Asian community have an unhealthy view of women, and that an "unhealthy brand of politics 'imported' from Pakistan", which involved "looking after your own", was partly to blame.

British Muslims and members of the British-Pakistani community condemned both the abuse and that it had been covered up. Nazir Afzal, Chief Crown Prosecutor of the Crown Prosecution Service (CPS) for North West England from 2011–2015, himself a Muslim, made the decision in 2011 to prosecute the Rochdale child sex abuse ring after the CPS had turned the case down. Responding to the Jay report, he argued that the abuse had no basis in Islam: "Islam says that alcohol, drugs, rape and abuse are all forbidden, yet these men were surrounded by all of these things."

Afzal argued that the cases were about male power: "It is not the abusers' race that defines them. It is their attitude to women that defines them." The handling of the cases was a matter of incompetence rather than political correctness. He agreed with Danczuk that the nature of the night-time economy skewed the picture—more Pakistani-heritage men work at night and might therefore be more involved in that kind of activity. The incoming director of children's services in Rotherham, Ian Thomas, disagreed, arguing that the "night-time economy is full of white blokes. Ninety-two per cent of the people in Rotherham are white." Alexis Jay also disagreed; she told The Guardian in 2015 that working in the night-time economy "presents an opportunity but it doesn't present a motive".

The UK Hindu Council and the Sikh Federation asked that the perpetrators be described as Pakistani Muslims, rather than Asian. Britain First and the English Defence League staged protests in Rotherham, as did Unite Against Fascism.

Casey inquiry
Following the Jay report, the Secretary of State for Communities and Local Government, Eric Pickles, commissioned an independent inspection of Rotherham Council. Led by Louise Casey, director-general of the government's Troubled Families programme, the inspection examined the council's governance, services for children and young people, and taxi and private-hire licensing.

Published in February 2015, the Casey report concluded that Rotherham Council was "not fit for purpose". Casey identified a culture of "bullying, sexism ... and misplaced 'political correctness'", along with a history of covering up information and silencing whistleblowers. The child-sexual-exploitation team was poorly directed, suffered from excessive case loads, and did not share information. The council had a history of failing to deal with issues around race: "Staff perceived that there was only a small step between mentioning the ethnicity of perpetrators and being labelled a racist." The Pakistani-heritage councillors were left to deal with all issues pertaining to that community, which left them able to exert disproportionate influence, while white councillors ignored their responsibilities. Councillor Jahangir Akhtar, in particular, was named as too influential, including regarding police matters.

In February 2015 the government replaced its elected officers with a team of five commissioners, including one tasked specifically with looking at children's services. Files relating to one current and one former councillor identifying "a number of potentially criminal matters" were passed to the National Crime Agency. The leader of the council, Paul Lakin, resigned, and members of the council cabinet also stood down.

Operation Clover, trials (2015–2017)

December 2015
South Yorkshire police set up Operation Clover in August 2013 to investigate historic cases of child sexual abuse in the town.

As a result, six men and two women went on trial before Judge Sarah Wright on 10 December 2015 at Sheffield Crown Court, with Michelle Colborne QC prosecuting. Four were members of the Hussain family—three brothers and their uncle, Qurban Ali—named in Adele Weir's 2001 report. The Hussain family were said to have "owned" Rotherham. Ali owned a local minicab company, Speedline Taxis; one of the accused women had worked for Speedline as a radio operator. A fourth Hussain brother, Sageer Hussain, was convicted in November 2016. It was alleged in late 2018 that Arshid Hussain was contacted by Rotherham council whilst in prison in relation to care proceedings for his child which was conceived during a rape. The child's mother and victim of Hussain Sammy Woodhouse accused the council of putting her child at risk and an online petition calling for a change in the law reached more than 200,000 signatures.

On 24 February 2016, Ali was convicted of conspiracy to rape and sentenced to 10 years. Arshid "Mad Ash" Hussain, apparently the ringleader, was jailed for 35 years. He appeared in court by video link and seemed to be asleep in bed when the verdict was announced. His lawyer said he had been left paraplegic by a shooting accident; the prosecution alleged that his claim to be too ill to attend was simply a ploy. Arshid's brother Bannaras "Bono" Hussain was jailed for 19 years, and Basharat "Bash" Hussain for 25 years. Two other men were acquitted, one of seven charges, including four rapes, and the second of one charge of indecent assault.

The court heard that the police had once caught Basharat Hussain in the act, but failed to do anything. He was with a victim in a car park next to Rotherham police station, when a police car approached and asked what he was doing. He replied: "She's just sucking my cock, mate", and the police car left.

Karen MacGregor and Shelley Davies were convicted of false imprisonment and conspiracy to procure prostitutes. MacGregor had worked for Qurban Ali as a radio operator at Speedline Taxis. She was sentenced to 13 years and Davies was given an 18-month suspended sentence. MacGregor and Davies would befriend girls and take them back to MacGregor's home. Acting as surrogate parents, the women bought them food and clothes, and listened to their problems. The girls were then given alcohol and told to earn their keep by having sex with male visitors. MacGregor had even applied for charitable status for a local group she had set up, Kin Kids, to help the carers of troubled teenagers. She had been supported in this by John Healey, MP for Wentworth and Dearne (who did not know that children were being procured for sex), and had attended a meeting at Westminster to speak about it.

September 2016
Eight men went on trial in September 2016 and were convicted on 17 October that year. A fourth Hussain brother, Sageer Hussain, was jailed for 19 years for four counts of raping a 13-year-old girl and one indecent assault. The girl's family, then owners of a local post office and shop, had reported the rapes at the time to police, their MP, and David Blunkett, the home secretary, to no avail.

First groomed when she was 12, the girl told the court she had been raped multiple times from the age of 13, on the first occasion in November 2002 by nine men who took photographs. On another occasion she was locked in a room while men lined up outside. She was threatened with a gun, and told they would gang-rape her mother, kill her brother and burn her home down. Every time it happened, she hid the clothes she had been wearing. In April 2003, when she was 13, she told her mother, who alerted the police; the court was shown video of an interview police conducted with her that month. The police collected the bags of clothes, then called two days later to say they had lost them. The family was sent £140 compensation for the clothes and advised to drop the case. Unable to find anyone to help them, they sold their business in 2005 and moved in fear to Spain for 18 months.

Sageer Hussain gave an interview to Channel 4 News in 2014, after his brother, Arshid Hussain, was named in the media as a ringleader. Sageer attributed the abuse to girls wearing miniskirts: "The biggest part of the problem you have these days is these young girls, that are dressed up, i.e. miniskirts, stuff like that, they're going into the clubs, and they're ending up going with blokes, and stuff like that, and they're waking up next morning, and they scream rape. Or groomed." Asked about the allegation that his brother had assaulted 12-year-olds, he compared having sex with 12-year-olds to "like going and eating that dog crap; they wouldn't do it", and blamed social services for having let the girls out in the first place.

Sageer's brother Basharat Hussain, already sentenced to 25 years in February 2016, was convicted of indecent assault and given an additional seven-year sentence, to run concurrently. Two cousins of the Hussains, Asif Ali and Mohammed Whied, were convicted of rape and aiding and abetting rape, respectively. Four other men were jailed for rape or indecent assault.

January 2017
Six men, including three brothers, went on trial in January 2017 before Judge Sarah Wright, with Sophie Drake prosecuting. All were convicted of 21 offences in relation to assaults between 1999 and 2001 on two girls, aged 11 and 13 when the abuse began. The girls were assaulted in a fireworks shop and in a flat above a row of shops, both owned by the brothers' father. One girl, aged 12 at the time, was locked in the "extremely dirty" flat overnight with no electricity or running water. A rape by Basharat Hussain was reported to the police in 2001; he was questioned but released without charge. One of the girls became pregnant at age 12, but she had been raped by five men and did not know who the father was; DNA tests established that it was one of the defendants. After sentencing, two of the men shouted "Allahu Akbar" as they were led out of the court.

May 2017 
A 21st person was found guilty of sexual offences in May 2017.

National Crime Agency inquiry
The National Crime Agency (NCA) set up Operation Stovewood in December 2014 to conduct a criminal inquiry and to review South Yorkshire Police investigations. The NCA inquiry was led by the NCA director, Trevor Pearce, before being led by Deputy Director Roy McComb. As of 2016 the inquiry was expected to last eight years and cost over £30 million. By June 2015 Operation Stovewood had identified 300 suspects.

November 2017
Three men were arrested in July 2016 and charged in December 2016 with the indecent assault of a girl under the age of 14 between June 1994 and June 1995. They were convicted following a trial in November 2017 at Sheffield Crown Court. The men befriended the 13-year-old in Rotherham before plying her with alcohol and raping her. Judge David Dixon told the three they had 'groomed, coerced and intimidated' their victim and treated her 'like a thing'. The girl went on to suffer from eating disorders, anxiety and depression as a result of her ordeal, the court heard.

February 2018
A fourth man was convicted as part of Operation Stovewood in February 2018.

May 2018
A fifth man was convicted in early May 2018 and a sixth on the 31 May. Tony Chapman admitted 12 charges of indecently assaulting a girl under the age of 16 between February 1998 and January 1999 when he appeared at court on 17 April. He was also found guilty of five offences against two separate girls including rape, assault occasioning actual bodily harm and threatening to kill following a nine-day trial at Sheffield Crown Court yesterday. The offences took place between October 2013 and May 2015, when the girls were under the age of 16.

Khurram Javed was found guilty of one count of sexual assault of a 16-year-old girl when he was 31 years old. He was sentenced to two years imprisonment.

July 2018 

Five men were charged with a total of 21 offences, including rape and indecent assault against two girls under the age of sixteen between 2001 and 2004. The court heard how the girls were groomed in and around the Meadowhall shopping centre when they were twelve or thirteen and one of the accused had sex with a girl within the shopping complex. Three of the men were found not guilty on all counts, whilst a fourth man failed to appear at court and is believed to have left the country. A warrant has been issued for his arrest.

October 2018 
A man was sentenced to nine years in prison for sexual activity with a child in October. Darren Hyett took the 15-year-old girl out in his taxi and showered her with gifts when he was 41.

In late October 2018, seven men, the largest number prosecuted under the National Crime Agency's Operation Stovewood investigation so far, were also convicted of sexual offences against five girls committed between 1998 and 2005. They were first prosecuted in September as a group of 8 men charged with various child sexual offences, 2 of which were said to have raped a young girl in Sherwood Forest between August 2002 and 2003, giving her drugs and alcohol and threatening to abandon her if she did not comply with their demands. The girl later had to have an abortion after falling pregnant. One said she had slept with 100 Asian men by the time she was 16.

August 2019 
In August 2019, seven men became the latest to be convicted under Operation Stovewood relating to the sexual exploitation of seven teenage girls more than a decade previously, at least four were already in prison at the time of sentencing. Aftab Hussain was sentenced to 24 years for indecent assault after being jailed for 3 years and 4 months in a separate investigation back in April 2016 after he admitted two counts of sexual activity with a child and attempted witness intimidation. Hussain, who worked as a takeaway delivery driver, contacted the then 15-year-old girl via social media in 2015 and took her out in his car whilst making deliveries and then made threats to hurt her if she told anyone. Masaued Malik was sentenced to 5 years after being previously sentenced to 15 years in September 2016 under Operation Clover for similar offences. Mohammed Ashen pleaded guilty to three counts of indecent assault. Ashen was already in prison serving a 17-year sentence (reduced from 19 years) for murder after an incident in a Rotherham nightclub in 2005 where he stabbed Kimberley Fuller nine times after she confronted him for touching her inappropriately. Prior to this, he was jailed for threatening a former partner with a knife. Waseem Khaliq was sentenced to 10 years in prison. He was then sentenced for a further 45 months after admitting three counts of witness intimidation after posting allegations against his victims on fake Facebook and Twitter accounts. He also made a phone call from prison to the National Crime Agency control centre threatening two of the investigating officers saying that he knew where one of them lived and that he hoped they died of cancer or AIDS.

October 2022 
A 63-year-old man was charged with two sexual offences against a 13-year-old girl as part of Operation Stovewood.

January 2023 
Three men were charged with various sexual offences against two victims who were residents of a children's home between 2011 and 2012. Two more men were then later charged with sexual offences against 10 victims later in the same month.

Independent Police Complaints Commission inquiry
The Independent Police Complaints Commission (IPCC) began an investigation into allegations of police wrongdoing following the Jay report. It was the second-largest inquiry the IPCC has undertaken after the inquiry into the 1989 Hillsborough football disaster in Sheffield; that game was policed by South Yorkshire Police. As of March 2017 nine inquiries were complete, with no case to answer regarding officer conduct, but recommendations were made to the force about the recording of information. Another 53 investigations were underway.

According to Andrew Norfolk in The Times, one Rotherham police officer had been in regular contact with one of the perpetrators. In one incident in March 2000, he and a local taxi driver—who later became a Rotherham councillor—are alleged to have arranged for Arshid Hussain, arguably the gang's ringleader, to hand a girl over to police at a petrol station "in exchange for immunity". Another complaint concerned the same officer, who reportedly asked two of the victims out on a date. One victim reported this to police in August 2013, but no action was taken. The IPCC was also investigating the officer who failed to act on the report. The first officer died in January 2015 after being hit by a car in Sheffield, in an unrelated accident.

A five-year investigation by the Independent Office for Police Conduct (IOPC) found that the Rotherham police ignored the sexual abuse of children for decades for fear of increasing racial tensions. The IOPC upheld a complaint from the father of one of the victims that police took "insufficient action". The complainant claims he was told by a police officer the town "would erupt" if it became known that Asian men were regularly sexually abusing underage girls.

2020 Home Office Report
The Rotherham case was one of several cases which prompted investigations looking into the claim that the majority of perpetrators from grooming gangs were British Pakistani; the first was by Quilliam in December 2017, which released a report entitled Group Based Child Sexual Exploitation – Dissecting Grooming Gangs, which claimed 84% of offenders were of South Asian heritage. However this report was "fiercely" criticised for its unscientific nature and poor methodology by child sexual exploitation experts Ella Cockbain and Waqas Tufail, in their paper Failing Victims, Fuelling Hate: Challenging the Harms of the 'Muslim grooming gangs' Narrative which was published in January 2020.

A further investigation was carried out by the British government in December 2020, when the Home Office published their findings, showing that the majority of child sexual exploitation gangs were, in fact, composed of white men and not British Pakistani men.

"Beyond specific high-profile cases, the academic literature highlights significant limitations to what can be said about links between ethnicity and this form of offending. Research has found that group-based CSE offenders are most commonly White. Some studies suggest an over-representation of Black and Asian offenders relative to the demographics of national populations. However, it is not possible to conclude that this is representative of all group-based CSE offending. This is due to issues such as data quality problems, the way the samples were selected in studies, and the potential for bias and inaccuracies in the way that ethnicity data is collected"; the report also added "Based on the existing evidence, and our understanding of the flaws in the existing data, it seems most likely that the ethnicity of group-based CSE offenders is in line with CSA [child sexual abuse] more generally and with the general population, with the majority of offenders being White".

Writing in The Guardian, Cockbain and Tufail wrote of the report that "The two-year study by the Home Office makes very clear that there are no grounds for asserting that Muslim or Pakistani-heritage men are disproportionately engaged in such crimes, and, citing our research, it confirmed the unreliability of the Quilliam claim".

See also

 Child sexual abuse in the United Kingdom
 Derby child sex abuse ring
 Huddersfield grooming gang
 Independent Inquiry into Child Sexual Abuse
 Jimmy Savile sexual abuse scandal
 Manchester child sex abuse ring
 Newcastle sex abuse ring
 North Wales child abuse scandal
 Oulu child sexual exploitation scandal
 Oxford child sex abuse ring
 Rochdale child sex abuse ring
 List of sexual abuses perpetrated by groups

Notes

References

Works cited
The article cites the following books and reports. All other sources are listed in the References section only.

Further reading

Home Affairs Committee
 Child sexual exploitation and the response to localised grooming. Second Report of Session 2013–14, Vol. 1, House of Commons Home Affairs Committee. London: The Stationery Office Limited, 10 June 2013.
 Child sexual exploitation and the response to localised grooming. Second Report of Session 2013–14, Vol. 2, House of Commons Home Affairs Committee. London: The Stationery Office Limited, 12 June 2013.
 Child sexual exploitation and the response to localised grooming: follow-up. Sixth Report of Session 2014–15, House of Commons Home Affairs Committee. London: The Stationery Office Limited, 15 October 2014.

Miscellaneous
 "Revealed: conspiracy of silence on UK sex gangs", The Times (editorial), 5 January 2011.
 
 
 Phillip, Abby (27 August 2014). "Report reveals the horrors of 1,400 sexually abused children in a British town and the system that failed them", The Washington Post.
 Talbot, Margaret (4 September 2014). "An Old Contempt in Rotherham", The New Yorker.
 Flanagin, Jake (4 September 2014). "How Rotherham Happened", The New York Times.
 Douthat, Ross (6 September 2014). "Rape and Rotherham", The New York Times.
 "Too many in Rotherham turned a blind eye to child abuse", The Washington Post (editorial board), 15 September 2014.
 
 Wilson, Sarah, with Geraldine McKelvie (2015). Violated: A Shocking and Harrowing Survival Story from the Notorious Rotherham Abuse Scandal. London: Harper Element. 
 "Op Stovewood: Victims get justice after another six men guilty of sexually abusing young girls in Rotherham " (28 August 2019), National Crime Agency

2000s in South Yorkshire
2014 in England
2014 scandals
Child sexual abuse in England
Crime in South Yorkshire
Labour Party (UK) scandals
History of South Yorkshire
Pakistani-British gangs
Police misconduct in England
Politics of Rotherham
Gang rape in Europe
Race relations in the United Kingdom
Rape in England
Rape in Yorkshire
Scandals in England
Sex gangs
Sexual abuse cover-ups
Torture in England
Violence against women in England
Child prostitution in the United Kingdom
Honour killing in the United Kingdom
Incidents of violence against girls